ABN is the Australian Broadcasting Corporation's television station in Sydney. The station began broadcasting on 5 November 1956. Its original studios were located in Gore Hill and were in use up until March 2004, when they were co-located with ABC Radio, Radio Australia, ABC-TV Set Construction and ABC Australia at the Corporation's headquarters in the inner city suburb of Ultimo. Its main transmitter, however, remains at Gore Hill. The station can be received throughout the state through a number of relay transmitters, as well as satellite transmission on the Optus Aurora platform.

History
The first national public television station in Australia opened in Sydney at 7:00pm on 5 November 1956 under the call sign ABN-2. It was opened by Prime Minister of Australia Robert Menzies, with the first television broadcast presented by Michael Charlton, and James Dibble reading the first television news bulletin with full-time colour broadcasting introduced in March 1975.

For more than 40 years, Gore Hill was best known as the location of the ABC's Sydney television studios, which were fully opened in 1958 and which operated until 2002, when the site was closed and sold off. Later, the ABC moved its television operations to its broadcasting centre in Ultimo.

The station has also carried a number of programs originally produced at Channel 31 stations in other states (programs such as Aurora Community Channel and National Indigenous Television.

ABN commenced digital television transmission in January 2001, broadcasting on VHF Channel 12 while maintaining analogue transmission on VHF Channel 2.

The analogue television signal for Sydney, Gosford and surrounding areas was shut off at 9.00am on 3 December 2013.

Programming

Local programming
ABN's schedule is similar to the national ABC schedule, with the exception of some news, current affairs, sport and occasionally, election programming.

ABC News New South Wales is presented by Juanita Phillips (Sunday–Thursday) and Jeremy Fernandez (Friday–Saturday). The weeknight bulletins also incorporate NSW weather forecasts presented by Tom Saunders as well as a national finance segment presented by Alan Kohler in Melbourne.

Digital multiplex

Relay stations
The following stations relay ABN throughout New South Wales:

Notes

References

Television stations in Sydney
Television channels and stations established in 1956
Australian Broadcasting Corporation television stations